Goodfellas is the debut studio album by hip hop group, 504 Boyz, released on May 2, 2000, on No Limit Records and Priority Records. 504 Boyz consisted  of Master P, Silkk The Shocker, Mystikal, C-Murder, Mac, Krazy and Magic. It featured production from The Neptunes, Carlos Stephens and Donald XL Robertson.  The album features label mates Snoop Dogg, Mercedes, Erica Foxx, Samm, Black Felon/X-Con, Ms Peaches, Mr Marcelo, Jamo, Traci/Baby Girl, D.I.G. and Ghetto Commission, as well as Pusha T (who, at the time, went by the name Terrar), Pharrell and RBX.

Goodfellas was a huge success debuting at #1 on the Top R&B/Hip-Hop Albums and #2 on the Billboard 200, behind only NSYNC's No Strings Attached, with first-week sales of 139,000 copies in the US.  The album featured 2 singles: "Wobble Wobble", which made it #17 on the Billboard Hot 100 and #1 on the Hot Rap Singles . The other single/video release was Whodi. Planning of this album dates back to 1997, as ads for it can be found in the liner notes of many of the 1997 No Limit releases. The album received a Gold certification by the Recording Industry Association of America by August 29, 2000.

Track listing

Charts

Weekly charts

Year-end charts

Certifications

See also
List of number-one R&B albums of 2000 (U.S.)

References

2000 debut albums
504 Boyz albums
Albums produced by Fredwreck
Albums produced by the Neptunes
No Limit Records albums
Priority Records albums
Gangsta rap albums by American artists